Cajonos Zapotec (Southern Villa Alta Zapotec, Zapoteco de San Pedro Cajonos) is a Zapotec language of Oaxaca, Mexico. It is spoken in several towns named Cajonos, as well as, San Pedro Cajonos, San Pablo Yaganiza and Xagacía. There are significant differences with the dialects of the latter.

References

Méndez S., Pedro, compiler, & others. 2004. Diccionario zapoteco; Zapoteco de San Pablo Yaganiza, Oaxaca. Mexico City: Instituto Lingüístico de Verano.

Zapotec languages